Thomas Sidney Jesup (December 16, 1788 – June 10, 1860) was a United States Army officer known as the "Father of the Modern Quartermaster Corps".  His 52-year (1808–1860) military career was one of the longest in the history of the United States Army.

Biography
Thomas Jesup was born in Berkeley County, Virginia (now West Virginia). He began his military career in 1808, and served in the War of 1812, seeing action in the battles of Chippewa and Lundy's Lane in 1814, where he was wounded. He was appointed Quartermaster General on May 8, 1818, by President James Monroe.

Seminole War and controversy
In 1836, while Jesup was still officially Quartermaster General, President Andrew Jackson detached him first to deal with the Creek tribe in Georgia and Alabama, and then to assume command of all U.S. troops in Florida during the Second Seminole War (1835–1842). His capture of Seminole leaders Osceola and Micanopy under a false flag of truce provoked controversy in the United States and abroad.
Many newspapers called for an inquiry and his firing but the government supported its general, and at the conclusion of the hostilities, Jesup returned to his official post.
He was famously quoted as having declared about the Seminole that "[t]he country can be rid of them only by exterminating them."

Further service
During the Mexican–American War, Jesup traveled from his headquarters in Washington, D.C., to oversee the supplying of troops in Mexico. He served as Quartermaster General for 42 years, having the second longest continual service in the same position in U.S. military history (George Gibson served as Commissary General of the US Army for 43 years, from 1818 until 1860).

He died in office in Washington, D.C., in June 10, 1860 at age 72.

Dates of rank
2nd Lieutenant, 7th Infantry – 3 May 1808
1st Lieutenant, 7th Infantry – 1 December 1809
Captain, 7th Infantry – 20 January 1813
Major, 19th Infantry – 6 April 1813
Major, 25th Infantry – 18 April 1814
Brevet Lieutenant Colonel – 5 July 1814
Brevet Colonel – 25 July 1814
Major, 1st Infantry – 17 May 1815
Lieutenant Colonel, 3rd Infantry – 30 April 1817
Colonel, Assistant Adjutant General – 27 March 1818
Brigadier General, Quartermaster General – 8 May 1818
Brevet Major General – 8 May 1828

Legacy and honors
Jesup, Georgia; Lake Jesup, Florida; and Fort Jesup, Louisiana, were named in his honor.
1986, Jesup was inducted into the Quartermaster Hall of Fame.
Battery Jesup at the Spanish–American War fort, Fort Fremont

References

External links

1788 births
1860 deaths
Military personnel from West Virginia
American military personnel of the Mexican–American War
United States Army personnel of the War of 1812
Burials at Oak Hill Cemetery (Washington, D.C.)
People from Berkeley County, West Virginia
People from West Virginia in the War of 1812
American people of the Seminole Wars
Quartermasters
United States Army generals